Mariama Diedhiou (born 26 March 1989) is a Senegalese footballer who plays as a forward for AS Dakar Sacré Cœur and the Senegal women's national team.

International career
Diedhiou capped for Senegal at senior level during the 2012 African Women's Championship.

References

1989 births
Living people
Women's association football forwards
Senegalese women's footballers
Senegal women's international footballers